Pekin Community High School District 303 is a public school district in Pekin, Illinois, that operates one high school, Pekin Community High School (PCHS).  the school has 1,780 students.

The  campus includes its principal campus buildings totaling  of space; these buildings house 133 classrooms, the 600 seat F.M. Peterson Theater, two gymnasiums, a natatorium, and several computer labs.

Controversies

Mascot controversy 
From the high school's founding until the 1981 school year, the football team was officially named the "Pekin Chinks", represented by a red dragon logo, done in part to represent the town of Pekin's wrongly supposed relation to the Chinese city of Peking. The team mascots were a male and a female student who would wear stereotypical Chinese attire, calling themselves the "Chink" and "Chinklette", and striking a gong whenever the team scored. In previous eras the community had almost no Chinese American residents.

In 1974 members of the National Organization of Chinese-Americans took offense to the name and suggested to municipal government employees that the sports team should have a different name. The members asked the mayor and the city attorney to intervene but the response was that they were unable to. The area Chamber of Commerce argued that the community took opposition to the idea of the mascot being offensive. That year, a vote was conducted within the student body to change the name, and the vote ended in a landslide victory for "chinks" at 1,034 votes to 182. In 1975 the Peoria Journal Star stopped including the mascot name in the publication. A second vote received similar results. As time passed additional publications no longer included the mascot name. The school stopped displaying statues of the mascots. In 1980,  the school board forced a name change to "Pekin Dragons"; a name that has stayed to the present. By the 1990s, some graduates from the pre-dragon era of the district have expressed a desire for the original name to return, despite being criticized for being degrading, racist, and lacking common decency. Historian James W. Loewen noted that the name "Dragons" was also problematic, given that Pekin had been notorious for being a statewide Ku Klux Klan headquarters in the 1920s, with the Klan owning the Pekin Daily Times for several years, and with a prominent Klan leader still living in Pekin in 2005.

Kevin Pummill 
In April 2019, a web page on the website IdentifyEvropa connected Kevin Pummill, a PCHS social studies teacher, to messages under the name "Undercover Academic" on an Internet site of white supremacist group Identity Evropa.  PCHS started an investigation, and the teacher resigned early in the investigation.  The district superintendent said that the school confirmed that "the teacher made a number of troubling and offensive posts" on an Internet site.  At first the school district refused to name Pummill as the teacher involved.  The superintendent later said that "the school is not aware of any instances of discriminatory conduct against students by the teacher"  but did not say whether the investigation was complete.

Notable alumni
Scott Altman, retired astronaut and Navy captain 
Everett Dirksen (class of 1913), politician representing Illinois in the U.S. House and Senate
Larry Kenney, voice actor and radio personality
Mark Luft, Illinois House of Representatives member and Pekin mayor
D.A. Points, professional golfer
Jerald D. Slack, retired Air National Guard major general
Dave Snell, Bradley Braves men's basketball commentator
Richard Stolley, founding managing editor of People and Life journalist responsible for obtaining the Zapruder film
Rick Venturi, sports broadcaster and former football player and Northwestern head coach

References

External links
 Pekin Community High School District 303

Pekin, Illinois
School districts in Illinois
Schools in Tazewell County, Illinois
Public high schools in Illinois
1867 establishments in Illinois
School districts established in 1867